Jorge Enrique Illueca Sibauste (September 17, 1918 – May 3, 2012) was a Panamanian politician and diplomat who served as President of Panama in 1984.

Illueca was born in Panama City, Panama. He attended the University of Panama, Harvard University and the University of Chicago (Doctor of Law, 1955). He became one of the most important lawyers in his country, taught as a professor at the University of Panama, and by the 1970s had begun his diplomatic career, at first working at the United Nations on international law issues. He served as Ambassador of Panama to the United Nations from 1976 to 1981, and as Minister of Foreign Affairs of Panama from 1981 to 1983. In 1982 he was elected Vice President of Panama, and served as President for a few months in 1984 following the president's resignation until new elections in which he did not run. Also during this time, he was president of the UN General Assembly from 1983 to 1984. He served as a member of the Permanent Court of Arbitration at The Hague from 1974-1990 and as a member of the United Nations International Law Commission three times (1982–1986, 1987–1991 and 1997–2001). He continued to work for the United Nations, particularly on environmental issues.

He was known to be an outspoken opponent of the US Army's School of the Americas, which he called "the biggest base for destabilization in Latin America.”

During the remarkable life of Dr. Illueca, time was made for his family; a family that certainly grew to be very large. His first daughter, Irene, had one son (Daniel King) through her first marriage. She remarried and later adopted 2 of her grandchildren (Christian and Skyla). His eldest son Jorge Jr had 3 children from his first marriage (David, Jorge Jr Jr and Angelica.) And later on five more came along from his second marriage  (Helena, Emilia, Cecilia, Christa, and Eliza)

References

1918 births
2012 deaths
People from Panama City
Panamanian Roman Catholics
Presidents of Panama
Vice presidents of Panama
Presidents of the United Nations General Assembly
Permanent Representatives of Panama to the United Nations
Panamanian officials of the United Nations
International Law Commission officials
Harvard University alumni
University of Chicago alumni
University of Panama alumni
Academic staff of the University of Panama
Members of the International Law Commission